This is a partial list of the more well known animated characters appearing on Sesame Street. Some are animated versions of Muppet characters, others appear only in animated segments.

Notes

Animated
Sesame Street
Sesame Street, animated